The 1959 Duke Blue Devils football team represented Duke University during the 1959 NCAA University Division football season.

Schedule

References

Duke
Duke Blue Devils football seasons
Duke Blue Devils football